A tracking system, also known as a locating system, is used for the observing of persons or objects on the move and supplying a timely ordered sequence of location data for further processing. It is important to be aware of human tracking, further details are listed below.

Applications 
A myriad of tracking systems exists. Some are 'lag time' indicators, that is, the data is collected after an item has passed a point for example a bar code or choke point or gate. Others are 'real-time' or 'near real-time' like Global Positioning Systems (GPS) depending on how often the data is refreshed. There are bar-code systems which require items to be scanned and automatic identification (RFID auto-id). For the most part, the tracking worlds are composed of discrete hardware and software systems for different applications. That is, bar-code systems are separate from Electronic Product Code (EPC) systems, GPS systems are separate from active real time locating systems or RTLS for example, a passive RFID system would be used in a warehouse to scan the boxes as they are loaded on a truck - then the truck itself is tracked on a different system using GPS with its own features and software. The major technology “silos” in the supply chain are:

Distribution/warehousing/manufacturing 
Indoors assets are tracked repetitively reading e.g. a barcode,  any passive and active RFID and feeding read data into Work in Progress models (WIP) or Warehouse Management Systems (WMS) or ERP software. The readers required per choke point are meshed auto-ID or hand-held ID applications.

However tracking could also be capable of providing monitoring data without binding to a fixed location by using a cooperative tracking capability, e.g. an RTLS.

Yard management 
Outdoors mobile assets of high value are tracked by choke point,
802.11, Received Signal Strength Indication (RSSI), Time Delay on Arrival (TDOA), active RFID or GPS Yard Management; feeding into either third party yard management software from the provider or to an existing system. Yard Management Systems (YMS) couple location data collected by RFID and GPS systems to help supply chain managers to optimize utilization of yard assets such as trailers and dock doors. YMS systems can use either active or passive RFID tags.

Fleet management 
Fleet management is applied as a tracking application using GPS and composing tracks from subsequent vehicle's positions. Each vehicle to be tracked is equipped with a GPS receiver and relays the obtained coordinates via cellular or satellite networks to a home station.  Fleet management is required by:
 Large fleet operators, (vehicle/railcars/trucking/shipping)
 Forwarding operators (containers, machines, heavy cargo, valuable shippings)
 Operators who have high equipment and/or cargo/product costs
 Operators who have a dynamic workload

Person tracking

Person tracking relies on unique identifiers that are temporarily (RFID tags) or permanently assigned to persons like personal identifiers (including biometric identifiers), or national identification numbers and a way to sample their positions, either on short temporal scales as through GPS or for public administration to keep track of a state's citizens or temporary residents. The purposes for doing so are numerous, for example from welfare and public security to mass surveillance.

Attendance management 
Mobile phone services

Location-based services (LBS) utilise a combination of A-GPS, newer GPS and cellular locating technology  that is derived from the telematics and telecom world. Line of sight is not necessarily required for a location fix. This is a significant advantage in certain applications since a GPS signal can still be lost indoors. As such, A-GPS enabled cell phones and PDAs can be located indoors and the handset may be tracked more precisely. This enables non-vehicle centric applications and can bridge the indoor location gap, typically the domain of RFID and Real-time locating system (RTLS) systems, with an off the shelf cellular device.

Currently, A-GPS enabled handsets are still highly dependent on the LBS carrier system, so handset device choice and application requirements are still not apparent. Enterprise system integrators need the skills and knowledge to correctly choose the pieces that will fit the application and geography.

Operational requirements 

Regardless of the tracking technology, for the most part the end-users just want to locate themselves or wish to find points of interest. The reality is that there is no "one size fits all" solution with locating technology for all conditions and applications.

Application of tracking is a substantial basis for vehicle tracking in fleet management, asset management, individual navigation, social networking, or mobile resource management and more. Company, group or individual interests can benefit from more than one of the offered technologies depending on the context.

GPS tracking 

GPS has global coverage but can be hindered by line-of-sight issues caused by buildings and urban canyons.  RFID is excellent and reliable indoors or in situations where close proximity to tag readers is feasible, but has limited range and still requires  costly readers.  RFID stands for Radio Frequency Identification. This technology uses electromagnetic waves to receive the signal from the targeting object to then save the location on a reader that can be looked at through specialized software.

Real-time locating systems (RTLS)
RTLS are enabled by Wireless LAN systems (according to IEEE 802.11) or other wireless systems (according to IEEE 802.15) with multilateration. Such equipment is suitable for certain confined areas, such as campuses and office buildings. RTLS requires system-level deployments and server functions to be effective.

In virtual space 
In virtual space technology, a tracking system is generally a system capable of rendering virtual space to a human observer while tracking the observer's coordinates. For instance, in dynamic virtual auditory space simulations, a head tracker provides information to a central processor in real time and this enables the processor to select what functions are necessary to give feedback to the user in relation to where they are positioned.

Additionally, there is vision-based trajectory tracking, that uses a color and depth camera known as a KINECT sensor to track 3D position and movement. This technology can be used in traffic control, human-computer interface, video compression and robotics.

See also 

 Data logger
 Geopositioning
 GPS tracking
 Intelligent Mail barcode
 Internet geolocation
 Locating engine
 Location-based service
 MAC address anonymization
 Mass surveillance
 Multilateration
 Positional tracking
 Real-time locating
 RFID in schools
 Simultaneous localization and mapping
 Track and trace
 Vehicle tracking system

References

Further reading
 
 
 

Geopositioning
Navigation
Radio navigation
Technology systems

Ubiquitous computing
Wireless locating